The 2022–23 Army Black Knights men's ice hockey season was the 120th season of play for the program, the 113th at the Division I level, and the 20th in the Atlantic Hockey conference. The Black Knights represented the United States Military Academy and were coached by Brian Riley, in his 19th season.

Season
The start to Army's season could hardly have been worse. While the offense was still trying to cope with the loss of star forward Colin Bilek, the defense collapsed and allowed a barrage of shots to reach Gavin Abric. The worst came when the Black Knights were swept by Lindenwood, a first-year program, at home and dropped to the bottom of the national rankings. The team had a week off after that debacle but seemed to have figured out a few thigs upon return. The most obvious change was the implementation of a goaltending rotation between Abric and senior, Justin Evanson. That tactic payed instant dividends as the team allowed just 5 goals over a 5-game span and didn't lose a single match. The offense too began to improve and Joey Baez began taking over as the team's primary scorer.

By the midpoint of the season, the Black Knights were still recovering from their early-season woes but the team appeared to be on the right track. Army slowly moved up the Atlantic Hockey standings and had put themselves into a position for a potential home game in the playoffs. Unfortunately, the defense began playing inconsistently at the end of the season. Army split its final three weekend series and finished just 2 points behind Canisius for the final home site. Because of that, the team had to travel up to Buffalo, New York and the instability on the back end followed the Knights. After a poor performance in the first game, Army rebounded with an overtime shutout victory to push the series to a deciding third game. The offense was completely absent in the final game of the season and Army was sent packing with a 0–3 loss.

Departures

Recruiting

Roster
As of August 16, 2022.

Standings

Schedule and results

|-
!colspan=12 style=";" | Regular Season

|-
!colspan=12 style=";" |

Scoring statistics

Source:

Goaltending statistics

Rankings

Note: USCHO did not release a poll in weeks 1, 13, or 26.

References

2022–23
Army Black Knights
Army Black Knights
Army Black Knights men's ice hockey
Army Black Knights men's ice hockey